Bryvyth (Brevita) is a somewhat obscure Catholic saint, although the parish church in Lanlivery, Cornwall is dedicated to her.  There is also a well dedicated to her in woodland just outside the village.

Bryvyth is mentioned in three documents before the Reformation; in two she is said to be a woman and in one, a man but modern tradition has preferred the female identity.

In the first known source from 1423, the saint is mentioned as Briueta and later as Breutta (1473), Bryvyth (1539) and Brevita (1763). It has been suggested that the name comes from the Latin brevis vita meaning 'short life'.

See also

St Brevita’s Church, Lanlivery

References

Medieval English saints
Medieval Cornish saints
Christian saints in unknown century